Giuseppe Pierozzi (11 October 1883 – 22 April 1956) was an Italian stage and film actor.

Selected filmography

 Maddalena Ferat (1920)
 Through the Shadows (1923)
 Samson (1923)
 The Faces of Love (1924)
 The Fiery Cavalcade (1925)
 Girls Do Not Joke (1929)
 Lowered Sails (1931)
 Before the Jury (1931)
 Resurrection (1931)
 Paradise (1932)
 La Wally (1932)
 Zaganella and the Cavalier (1932)
 The Gift of the Morning (1932)
 Pergolesi (1932)
 Tourist Train (1933)
 Together in the Dark (1933)
 Those Two (1935)
 Adam's Tree (1936)
 Bayonet (1936)
 But It's Nothing Serious (1936)
 To Live (1937)
 The Ferocious Saladin (1937)
 The Former Mattia Pascal (1937)
 The Three Wishes (1937)
 Il signor Max (1937)
The House of Shame (1938)
 The Cuckoo Clock (1938)
 A Wife in Danger (1939)
 Two Million for a Smile (1939)
 The Dream of Butterfly (1939)
 The Document (1939)
 The Castle Ball (1939)
 The Night of Tricks (1939)
 A Thousand Lire a Month (1939)
 The First Woman Who Passes (1940)
 Two on a Vacation (1940)
 Manon Lescaut (1940)
 The Secret Lover (1941)
 The Hero of Venice (1941)
 In High Places (1943)
 Short Circuit (1943)
 Sad Loves (1943)
 A Little Wife (1943)
 The Priest's Hat (1944)
 My Widow and I (1945)
 The Innocent Casimiro (1945)
 Down with Misery (1945)
 I'll Sing No More (1945)
 Peddlin' in Society (1946)
 Bullet for Stefano (1947)
 Fatal Symphony (1947)
 The Captain's Daughter (1947)
 Mad About Opera (1948)
 A Night of Fame (1949)
 Miss Italia (1950)
 Song of Spring (1951)
 When in Rome (1952)

References

Bibliography
 Goble, Alan. The Complete Index to Literary Sources in Film. Walter de Gruyter, 1999.

External links

1883 births
1956 deaths
Italian male film actors
Italian male silent film actors
20th-century Italian male actors
Italian male stage actors
Male actors from Rome